Madrasa Mouradiyya is one of the madrasahs of the medina of Tunis.

Localization 
It is located in Souk El Kmach.

History
It was built between 1666 and 1675 during the reign of Murad II Bey of the Muradid dynasty in order to teach the Malikite doctrine.
The main purpose of building this madrasah was to make the muradid family get closer to the malikite elite and gain their support.
Nowadays, it serves as a training center for crafts workers.

Description
Ihe madrasa has the typical architecture of Tunisian madrasas during the beylical era: It has a rectangular hall surrounded with 4 porticos with Hafsid decoration columns.

Apart of the student rooms, it has a rectangular prayer room and a room of ablutions.

References 

	

Mouradiyya